Michael "Mike" Brodie (birth WGC), also known by the nickname of "Dandy" or "Badger", is an Irish rugby league footballer who played in the 2000s. He played at representative level for Ireland, and at club level in the Irish Elite League for the Treaty City Titans (in Limerick).

References

External links
Wales A 10 Ireland A 24
(archived by web.archive.org) Treaty City Titans profile
photograph of Michael Brodie

Living people
Ireland national rugby league team players
Irish rugby league players
Place of birth missing (living people)
Rugby league players from County Limerick
Treaty City Titans players
Year of birth missing (living people)